Tipula dorsimacula is a species of large crane fly in the family Tipulidae.

Subspecies
These two subspecies belong to the species Tipula dorsimacula:
 Tipula dorsimacula dorsimacula Walker, 1848
 Tipula dorsimacula shasta Alexander, 1919

References

Tipulidae
Articles created by Qbugbot
Insects described in 1848